Liam Williams (born March 1988) is an English comedian, actor and writer, known for his wry poetic presentation style. He was nominated for Best Newcomer at the 2013 Edinburgh Comedy Awards and for Best Show at the 2014 awards.

Life and career
Williams grew up in Leeds and read English at Homerton College at the University of Cambridge, where he was a member of Footlights. In 2009 he participated in the Cambridge heat of the Chortle Student Comedy Award. He supports Manchester United.

In 2010 Williams was the runner-up in the So You Think You're Funny competition at the Edinburgh Festival Fringe.

In 2013 Williams appeared as the guest stand-up on Russell Howard's Good News. Later that year he performed a solo show for the first time at the Edinburgh Fringe; he was nominated for Best Newcomer at the Edinburgh Comedy Awards. Williams also participated in a show with his fellow members of the comedy sketch group Sheeps, Daran Johnson and Alastair Roberts.

In 2014 Williams performed a new show at Edinburgh, Capitalism. It was nominated for Best Show at the Foster's Edinburgh Comedy Awards. He also recorded a series of short clips for the Channel 4 online series Comedy Blaps, based on a previous routine. After each Edinburgh festival, Williams performed his most recent show at the Soho Theatre and The Invisible Dot in London. He has also performed at the club with Sheeps.

Williams's 2015 Edinburgh show was called Bonfire Night. In 2015 Williams also wrote and presented a semi-autobiographical radio show titled Ladhood. The series was broadcast on BBC Radio 4. He participated in the People Time Comedy Feed skit for BBC Three alongside Sheeps, Jamie Demetriou, Natasia Demetriou, Claudia O'Doherty and Ellie White. Continuing with the cast (minus O'Doherty), he co-created the web series 2016: Year Friends. As an actor Williams appeared in the BBC Three comedies Uncle and Together and on Comedy Central UK's Drunk History. The second series of Williams's radio show Ladhood was broadcast on BBC Radio 4 in October 2017.

In January 2016, Williams co-directed with Matt Bulmer a one-off performance of Shakespeare's The Twelfth Night featuring a cast of comedians including Kieran Hodgson, Tim Key and The Pin, with proceeds going to Refugee Action. The play was staged again, with an altered cast, in July 2016 at the Latitude Festival and during London Wonderground at the South Bank in London.

At the 2016 Edinburgh Fringe festival, Williams presented his debut play, Travesty, following previews in London. December 2016 and January 2017 saw the presentation of the panto Ricky Whittington & His Cat, co-written by Williams and Daran Johnson and starring Charlotte Ritchie alongside previous comedy collaborators.

In 2017, a web mockumentary series called Pls Like was released by BBC Three, written by and starring Williams as a struggling comedian who wins a contest to become the next superstar megavlogger, but must first undertake a series of challenges to win the attached £10,000 prize. Along the way, several successful YouTubers give him help and advice. The show was renewed for a second series in June 2018 and it was broadcast in September 2018; a third series was shown in January 2021.

Later in 2017, Williams and Josie Long co-wrote and co-starred in the BBC Radio 4 comedy Perimeter, part of the ’Dangerous Visions’ season on the station. Williams also appeared on the final episode of series 2 of Live from the BBC, performing a 30-minute set. The Netflix version of the series features his full one-hour set, made available on the streaming service in July 2018. In 2018 he also guest starred in the comedies Friday Night Dinner and Stath Lets Flats.

In February 2019 Williams appeared as a hacktivist in the first episode of This Time with Alan Partridge. He also played main character Nathan in the BBC series Back to Life starring Daisy Haggard.

Williams wrote and starred in a TV adaptation of his radio series Ladhood, whose first series was released on BBC iPlayer on 24 November 2019. In February 2020, it was announced that Ladhood had been renewed for a second series of six episodes, which was released in August 2021. The third and final series was released in September 2022.

Williams released his debut novel, Homes and Experiences, in 2020, available on hardback and audiobook.

References

External links
 

1988 births
Date of birth missing (living people)
Living people
English male comedians
English stand-up comedians
English male actors
Alumni of the University of Cambridge
People from Garforth
People educated at Garforth Academy